Pranjivan Vishwanath Thaker, (c. 1860 - 1920), was Diwan of Saurashtra, Gujarat, the highest executive office under Rajput rule. He was the brother of Mahashankar Vishwanath Thaker, Chief Treasurer of the princely state of Limbdi.

Today, his descendants have settled, and can largely be found, in the United States of America.

See also
 Watson Museum: for a detailed exhibit on Pranjivan Thaker.

People from British India
People from Gujarat
1860 births
Year of death missing